Mark Tan Chun Lok (born 15 January 1996) is a Hong Kong professional footballer who currently plays for Chinese Super League club Guangzhou City.

Early career
In 2009, Mark won a Dreams Come True scholarship which allowed him to complete his high school studies in Britain at the Brooke House College Football Academy with all costs covered. Mark Tan signed a professional contract with Peterborough United in January 2010 after a six-week trial.

Club career
In 2013, he returned to Hong Kong and signed with YFCMD.

In 2015, he joined Pegasus.

Stating he was not ready to move to a big club yet, Tan joined Tai Po in 2016. He earned the Best Young Player award for the second consecutive year during the 2016-17 season.

Following two years at Tai Po, Tan signed a three and a half year contract with Chinese Super League side Guangzhou R&F on 13 July 2018.

On 26 October 2019, Tan made his debut for Guangzhou R&F in Chinese Super League after substituting Zou Zheng in the 87th minute during the game against Hebei China Fortune. He became a regular first team member in the 2021 season in which he was deployed as an attacking midfielder in several occasions.

International career
Tan is a member of the Hong Kong national under-23 football team that plays in the 2014 Asian Games. He broke his leg in the match against Bangladesh and has to return to Hong Kong for treatment, missing the last 16 clash against hosts South Korea.

He made his full international debut in an friendly against Thailand on 9 October 2015.

On 13 July 2018, Tan's club Guangzhou R&F confirmed that they would release him to participate in the 2018 Asian Games.

Career statistics

Club
Statistics accurate as of match played 27 August 2022.

Notes

International

International goals
Scores and results list Hong Kong's goal tally first.

Honours

Club
Pegasus
 Hong Kong Sapling Cup: 2015–16

Tai Po
Hong Kong Sapling Cup: 2016–17

Individual
Best Young Player: 2015–16, 2016–17

Personal life
Mark's elder brother Tan Ka Lok was also a professional footballer. He played for First Division clubs Eastern and Sun Hei.

References

External links 

1996 births
Living people
Hong Kong footballers
Hong Kong international footballers
Footballers at the 2014 Asian Games
Hong Kong Premier League players
Chinese Super League players
Yokohama FC Hong Kong players
TSW Pegasus FC players
Tai Po FC players
Guangzhou City F.C. players
R&F (Hong Kong) players
Association football midfielders
Footballers at the 2018 Asian Games
Asian Games competitors for Hong Kong
Hong Kong expatriate sportspeople in China
Expatriate footballers in China
Hong Kong expatriate footballers